Alvarado may refer to:

Places
Alvarado, Tolima, Colombia
Alvarado (canton), Costa Rica
Alvarado, Veracruz, Mexico
Alvarado (municipality), Veracruz, Mexico
Alvarado, Extremadura, Spain
 Alvarado I solar thermal power station, in Alvarado, Spain
Alvarado, California, US
Alvarado, Indiana, US
Alvarado, Minnesota, US
Alvarado, Texas, US
Alvarado, Virginia, US

Other uses
 Alvarado (surname)
 Alvarado family, conquistadors
 Alvarado wrestling family
 Alvarado (Madrid Metro), a station on Line 1
 Alvarado Transportation Center, a multimodal transit hub in Albuquerque, New Mexico, US
 Alvarado High School, a high school in the Alvarado Independent School District, Alvarado, Texas